Singhasan Battisi  is an Indian Hindi-language adventure and fantasy television series that aired on Sony Pal. The show is based on folktales of Singhasan Battisi. It is a prime time serial. The show stars Karan Suchak, Siddharth Arora, Sayantani Ghosh, Aditi Sajwan, Navina Bole and Cheshta Mehta. A sequel series Betaal Aur Singhasan Battisi aired on SAB TV in 2015.

Plot
The show is based on folktales of Singhaasan Battisi, this show story started on Raja Bhoja follows the adventures of in conquest of the famed throne of Raja Vikramaditya.

Cast
 Karan Suchak as Maharaj Vikramaditya
 Siddharth Arora as Maharaj Bhoja
 Sayantani Ghosh as Devi Mahamaya
 Kajal Jain as Maharani Chitralekha (Vikramaditya's wife)
 Cheshta Mehta as Maharani Vallari (Bhoj's wife)
 Ali Hassan as Rahu
 Aditi Sajwan 
 Navina Bole 
 Nikunj Malik
 Abhaas Mehta as Betaal
 Ankit Arora
 Priyanca Thakare
 Kunal Bakshi
 Poorti Arya as one of the rani in an episode
 Ujjawal Gauraha as Lobh Devta in an episode

References

External links

Sony SAB original programming
2014 Indian television series debuts
2015 Indian television series endings
[[Category:Sony Pal original